Brookton may refer to:

Brookton, Western Australia
Brookton, Georgia
Brookton, Maine